The Evil Genius book series is a collection of paperback publications published by McGraw-Hill/TAB Electronics.

Books already published 

Evil Genius collection in the chronological order of published release date:

2004 

 January 23 - 123 Robotics Experiments for the Evil Genius by Myke Predko
 March 12 - Electronic Gadgets for the Evil Genius by Robert E. Iannini
 November 24 - Electronic Circuits for the Evil Genius by Dave Cutcher

2005 

 June 21 - 123 PIC Microcontroller Experiments for the Evil Genius by Myke Predko
 September 15 - Mechatronics for the Evil Genius: 25 Build-it-Yourself Projects by Newton Braga
 November 22 - 50 Awesome Auto Projects for the Evil Genius by Gavin Harper
 December 20 - MORE Electronic Gadgets for the Evil Genius: 40 NEW Build-it-Yourself Projects by Robert Iannini
 December 22 - Bionics for the Evil Genius: 25 Build-it-Yourself Projects by Newton Braga

2006 

 January 20 - Electronics Sensors for the Evil Genius: 54 Electrifying Projects by Thomas Petruzzellis
 June 19 - 101 Spy Gadgets for the Evil Genius by Brad Graham, Kathy McGowan
 August 30 - 50 Model Rocket Projects for the Evil Genius by Gavin D. J. Harper
 October 20 - Electronic Games for the Evil Genius by Thomas Petruzzellis
 December 20 - 25 Home Automation Projects for the Evil Genius by Jerri Ledford
 December 22 - PC Mods for the Evil Genius by Jim Aspinwall

2007 

 April 20 - 101 Outer Space Projects for the Evil Genius by Dave Prochnow
 June 22 - Solar Energy Projects for the Evil Genius by Gavin D. J. Harper
 September 19 - 51 High-Tech Practical Jokes for the Evil Genius by Brad Graham, Kathy McGowan
 September 24 - 22 Radio and Receiver Projects for the Evil Genius by Thomas Petruzzellis

2008 

 March 28 - Programming Video Games for the Evil Genius by Ian Cinnamon
 April 29 - Fuel Cell Projects for the Evil Genius by Gavin D. J. Harper
 May 13 - Bike, Scooter, and Chopper Projects for the Evil Genius by Brad Graham, Kathy McGowan
 August 6 - 46 Science Fair Projects for the Evil Genius by Bob Bonnet, Dan Keen
 September 17 - 40 Telephone Projects for the Evil Genius by Thomas Petruzzellis

2009 

 January 14 - 50 Green Projects for the Evil Genius by Jamil Shariff
 March 21 - 125 Physics Projects for the Evil Genius by Jerry Silver
 September 16 - Mind Performance Projects for the Evil Genius by Brad Graham, Kathy McGowan

2010 

 June 21 - Holography Projects for the Evil Genius by Gavin Harper
 July 28 - 30 Arduino Projects for the Evil Genius by Simon Monk
 August 12 - PICAXE Microcontroller Projects for the Evil Genius by Ron Hackett
 August 12 - Recycling Projects for the Evil Genius by Russel Gehrke
 September 24 - Electronic Circuits for the Evil Genius 2/E by Dave Cutcher

2011 

 January 18 - tinyAVR Microcontroller Projects for the Evil Genius by Dhananjay Gadre
 May 3 - 15 Dangerously Mad Projects for the Evil Genius by Simon Monk
 September 30 - 101 Spy Gadgets for the Evil Genius 2/E by Brad Graham, Kathy McGowan
 November 15 - Arduino + Android Projects for the Evil Genius: Control Arduino with Your Smartphone or Tablet by Simon Monk

2013 
 May 31 - 30 Arduino Projects for the Evil Genius 2/E by Simon Monk
 August 16 - Electronic Gadgets for the Evil Genius 2/E by Robert Iannini
September 4 - Raspberry Pi Projects for the Evil Genius by Donald Norris

2014 
 September 29 - 30 BeagleBone Black Projects for the Evil Genius by Christopher Rush

2016 
 May 30 - Raspberry Pi Electronic Projects for the Evil Genius by Donald Norris
 December 16 - DIY Drones for the Evil Genius: Design, Build, and Customize Your Own Drones by Ian Cinnamon, Romi Kadri, Fitz Tepper

2017 
 August 4 - 20 Makey Makey Projects for the Evil Genius by Aaron Graves
 December 1 (planned) - Arduino and Raspberry Pi Sensor Projects for the Evil Genius by Robert Chin

Sources 
https://web.archive.org/web/20111209081628/http://www.mhprofessional.com/category/?cat=4205

Handbooks and manuals
Technology books
Series of books
McGraw-Hill books